Mauro Román Monzón (born October 4, 1999), known professionally as Lit Killah, is an Argentine rapper, singer and streamer. He is known for his participation in freestyle rap battles, he has participated in local competitions in Argentina such as the renowned "El Quinto Escalón" where he competed during 2016 and 2017. In 2018 he started competing in the international freestyle rap competition called "God Level".

His popularity began to grow when in 2018 he released his single "Apaga el Celular". In 2020 he released his most successful single called "Flexin'" with Argentine producer Bizarrap. Both songs have exceeded 100 million views on YouTube.

Career

Beginnings and first successes (2017-2021) 
Lit Killah started in the world of rap thanks to freestyle battles, one of his first battles was against Duki in 2016, Lit Killah won the battles thanks to the rhyme "Brisa", the battle was one of the most viewed on YouTube at that time year. In that same year he competed in "El Quinto Escalón" but did not win in that year, in 2017, Lit Killah managed to win his first competition in "El Quinto Escalón".

At the end of 2017, and coinciding with his birthday, he published his first single entitled "De$troy", a production faithful to the style demonstrated by Monzón in their previous encounters in freestyle battles. At just 18 years old, he signed a contract with Warner Music Argentina and starting 2018 he launched "Apaga el Celular", a song totally oriented to a melodic trap, whose official video clip already exceeds 100 million visits on YouTube. He subsequently released more singles, also featured as a guest artist on the song "Una Vez Más" of Numa, released on April 23. Jester released the following June had more than 20 million views in the first month since its premiere on YouTube.

MAWZ (2021-present) 
On August 19, 2021 Lit Killah released his debut studio album MAWZ with the participation of Argentine artists such as Duki, Khea, María Becerra, Tiago PZK, FMK and Rusherking and it was also produced by Argentine producers Oniria and Big One.

Discography

Albums

Studio albums

Singles

As lead artist

As a featured artist

Other charting songs

Footnotes

References

External links 
 
 
 

Argentine rappers
Argentine trap musicians
Latin trap musicians
1999 births
Living people
Musicians from Buenos Aires
Warner Music Latina artists
21st-century Argentine musicians